The Pennsylvania Railroad (PRR) class T1 duplex-drive 4-4-4-4 steam locomotives, introduced in 1942 with two prototypes and later in 1945-1946 with 50 production examples, were the last steam locomotives built for the PRR and arguably its most controversial. They were ambitious, technologically sophisticated, powerful, fast and distinctively streamlined by Raymond Loewy. However, they were also prone to wheelslip both when starting and at speed, in addition to being complicated to maintain and expensive to run.  The PRR decided in 1948 to place diesel locomotives on all express passenger trains, leaving unanswered questions as to whether the T1's flaws were solvable, especially taking into account that the two prototypes did not have the problems inherent to the production units. 

An article appearing in a 2008 issue of the Pennsylvania Railroad Technical and Historical Society Magazine showed that inadequate training for engineers transitioning to the T1 may have led to excessive throttle applications, resulting in driver slippage. Another root cause of wheelslip was faulty "spring equalization": The stiffnesses of the springs supporting the locomotive over the axles were not adjusted to properly equalize the wheel-to-track forces.  The drivers were equalized together but not equalized with the engine truck. In the production fleet the PRR equalized the engine truck with the front engine and the trailing truck with the rear engine, which helped to solve the wheelslip problem.

Development

Before the T1, the last production express passenger engine the PRR had produced was the K4s of 1914, produced until 1928. Two experimental enlarged K5 locomotives were produced in 1929, but they weren't considered enough of an improvement to be worthwhile. After that, the PRR's attention switched to electrification and the production of electric locomotives; apparently, the railroad decided that it did not need more steam locomotives.

However, the deficiencies of the K4s became more evident during the 1930s. The locomotives performed well, but as train lengths increased they proved to be underpowered; double headed K4s locomotives became the norm on many trains. The railroad had many locomotives available, but paying two crews on two locomotives per train was expensive.  Meanwhile, other railroads were leaping ahead, developing increasingly-powerful passenger train locomotives. Rival New York Central built 4-6-4 Hudsons, while other roads developed passenger 4-8-2 "Mountain" type and then 4-8-4 "Northern" type designs. The PRR's steam power began to look outdated.

The PRR began to develop steam locomotives again in the mid-to-late 1930s, but with a difference. Where previous PRR locomotive policy had been conservative, new radical designs took hold. Designers from the Baldwin Locomotive Works, the PRR's longtime development partner, were eager to prove the viability of steam in the face of new competition from Diesel-electric locomotives. They persuaded the railroad to adopt Baldwin's latest idea: the duplex locomotive. This split the locomotive's driving wheels into two sets, each with its own pair of cylinders and rods. Until then, the only locomotives with two sets of drivers were articulated locomotives, but the duplex used one rigid frame. In a duplex design cylinders could be smaller, and the weight of side and main rods could be drastically reduced. Given that the movement of the main rod could not be fully balanced, the duplex design would reduce the "hammer blow" on the track. The lower reciprocating mass meant that higher speeds could be achieved. Use of poppet valves also increased the speed because they gave very accurately timed delivery of steam to the cylinders.

The first PRR duplex was the single experimental S1 No. 6100 of 1939. It managed to reach 100.97 miles per hour (162.50 km/h) on level track while pulling a 1,350 ton passenger train. Its performance encouraged the PRR to continue to develop duplex steam locomotives. The S1 was built unnecessarily-large for her exhibition at the 1939 New York World's Fair until October 1940; therefore, its turning radius prohibited it from operating over most of the PRR network. The 6-4-4-6 design reduced driving set traction to the point that it was especially prone to wheel slip; thus only one Class S1 was built. The PRR returned to Baldwin to develop a duplex design fit for series production. The PRR ordered two Baldwin prototypes (Nos.  6110 and 6111) at a cost of $600,000 on June 26, 1940. Both prototypes had numerous teething problems and were prone to wheelslip if not handled carefully by the engineer. But favorable test reports resulted in a production order for 50 T1s, split between the PRR's own Altoona Works and Baldwin. On Dec 20, 1944, the PRR Board authorized the purchase of 50 Class T1 locomotives for $14,125,000 ($282,500 per unit). Baldwin's chief designer, Ralph P. Johnson, was responsible for the mechanical aspects of the new T1 class. Designer Raymond Loewy obtained US Patent D 136,260 for an early T1 conceptual design with a high-mounted cab located over the forward driving set. While that suited Baldwin's objective of making the most distinctive steam locomotive possible, practical considerations led the T1 design to be revised to the conventional cab position with a slight modification of the unique nose design included in Loewy's patent.

The last production T1 (no. 5549) entered service on August 27, 1946. They also regularly racked up over 8,000 miles a month.

Due to their complexity relative to other steam locomotive designs, the T1s were difficult to maintain. They were described as "free steaming," meaning they could generally maintain boiler pressure regardless of throttle setting. They were so powerful that violent wheel slip could occur over a wide speed range if the engineer did not handle the throttle carefully; loss of driver traction at high speeds, especially when the T1 was under heavy load while ascending grades, caused damage to the poppet valves. A technician charged with determining the cause of frequent poppet valve failures on the T1s claimed to have observed them being operated at speeds of up to 143 mph (230 km/h) to make up time.

Fate
When the PRR Board decided to dieselize all first-class prime trains in 1948, most T1s were downgraded to haul secondary trains. Some of them were withdrawn from passenger service in 1949; all were out of service by 1952. They were scrapped between 1951 and 1956.

No. 5550

In 2014, a non-profit group known as The T1 Trust began constructing an all-new, fully-operational T1 using the original plans with subtle performance improvements where necessary. The T1 Trust's goal is to provide mainline excursion service and to set the world speed record for a steam locomotive – currently held by the LNER Class A4 No. 4468 Mallard at 126 mph. The T1 Trust's cost estimate to build T1 number 5550 is $10 million, with an expected completion date of 2030 (This total has since been reduced to a bit more than $7 million, as a used PRR long haul tender has been acquired in lieu of new construction).

The construction of 5550 is also following construction and financing methods pioneered by the LNER Peppercorn Class A1 60163 Tornado project. The first piece of the locomotive, the keystone-shaped number plate, was cast in April, 2014, followed by the first minor component, a driving spring link pin, in October, 2014. Major components completed as of March, 2019 include two Boxpok drivers, the prow, cab, third-course boiler and fire door. Front tube sheet construction was under way by a fabricator in St. Louis, Missouri.

In media
A computer-generated version of a T1 was seen in the 2004 film Lemony Snicket's A Series of Unfortunate Events.

See also

 South Australian Railways 520 class, an Australian locomotive with similar streamlining style.
 LNER Peppercorn Class A1

References

Further reading

External links

 Chesapeake & Ohio Tests the PRR T1 - Chesapeake and Ohio Historical Magazine,  May 2005  by Stephenson, David R - The C&O test report contains information that is not widely known, and some of it contradicts generally accepted beliefs about the T1.
 Photos of PRR 4-4-4-4 locomotives
  An N Scale PRR T1 4-4-4-4 scratch building project
 A group that intends to build a full-size PRR T1
YouTube video displaying the operation of T1's on the Pennsylvania Railroad - At 3 minutes and 15 seconds, an example of the T1's infamous wheel slip can be observed.

Baldwin locomotives
4-4-4-4 locomotives
Streamlined steam locomotives
T1
Duplex locomotives
Passenger locomotives
Steam locomotives of the United States
Scrapped locomotives
Standard gauge locomotives of the United States
Raymond Loewy